Slamannan Football Club was a Scottish association football club based in the village of Slamannan, Stirlingshire.

History

The club was founded in 1886, and was made up entirely of miners.

The club competed in the Scottish Cup for five seasons between 1886 and 1890 as well as the regional Stirlingshire Cup competition.  The club reached the second round of the national cup in four of its five entries, but never the third.

Slamannan's best run in the Stirlingshire Cup was in 1888–89, when it reached the final, but lost 7–0 to East Stirlingshire F.C. in the final at Victoria Park in Camelon.  The same season, Slamannan suffered its biggest Scottish Cup defeat.  Having beaten Grangemouth F.C. in the first round, the club drew 3–3 against King's Park F.C. in the second, surrendering a 3–1 lead in the last ten minutes of the game, but lost 13–1 away in the replay, the club's kick and rush style not working on a better quality pitch.

In 1890–91, the last time the club played in the Scottish Cup proper, the club looked like it had reached the third round for the first time, beating Clydebank 5–3, with all of the all of the scores being registered in the same goal. However Clydebank protested that the goals had been the wrong height at one end  and the Bankies won the re-played tie. 

The club had more problems with its ground later in the season, in the Stirlingshire Cup quarter-final with East Stirlingshire.  The first attempt at the tie saw the referee declare the pitch unplayable, and the clubs played out a 2–2 draw as a friendly instead.  The following week, on the morning of the re-scheduled game, Slamannan telegraphed East Stirlingshire and the referee to say the ground was in a worse condition, but East Stirlingshire and the referee attended regardless, and the referee declared the pitch playable.  As Slamannan had not turned up, E.S. claimed the tie, but, 40 minutes after the scheduled kick-off time, a Slamannan XI was asssembled and went 5–1 up with ten minutes to go, when the referee called the tie off for bad light.  The Stirlingshire FA ordered the tie to be played off again at Barnsmuir, E.S. this time winning the tie 4–3.

From 1891–92, the Scottish Football Association introduced preliminary rounds, and the club never reached the first round proper again.  In the 1891–92 Stirlingshire Cup, the club lost in the first round to fellow village side Slamannan Rovers F.C., and the club stopped entering the competition.

From 1896 to 1898 the club became a Junior club so was ineligible for the senior competitions; in 1898, the club returned to Senior football, and entered the new Scottish Qualifying Cup; however it scratched in 1899–1900 before playing a tie, lost 7–0 to Clackmannan F.C. in 1900–01, and in 1901–02 scratched when drawn against the Wee County again.  The club had reached the semi-final of the Stirlingshire Cup in 1898–99, and lost to Falkirk Amateurs F.C. in the final of the Consolation Cup, but it did not play in the competition afterwards.

The club seems to have ceased operations that season, and was struck off the Scottish FA's register in April 1902.

Colours

The club originally wore a black, red, and blue jersey, probably in hoops.  From 1888 to 1890 it wore red and white stripes with navy shorts and thereafter changed the shirts to plain white.

Ground

The club played at Barnsmuir.  The ground was described as "peculiar", being more of cinder than grass, its shape dictated by a right of way running through it, and difficult to reach, requiring a 9 mile wagon journey from Falkirk railway station.

External links

Scottish Cup results

References 

Defunct football clubs in Scotland
Association football clubs established in 1886
1886 establishments in Scotland
Association football clubs disestablished in 1902
1902 disestablishments in Scotland
Football in Falkirk (council area)